Acraea necoda is a butterfly in the family Nymphalidae. It is found on the central and northern plateau in Ethiopia.

Description
Very close to Acraea encedon q,v.

Biology
The larvae feed on Urtica species.

Taxonomy
Hyalites (group encedon) Henning, 1993 
Telchinia (Telchinia) Henning & Williams, 2010 
Acraea (Actinote) (group encedon subgroup encedon) Pierre, J. & Bernaud, D., 2013 

See also Pierre & Bernaud, 2014

References

External links

Die Gross-Schmetterlinge der Erde 13: Die Afrikanischen Tagfalter. Plate XIII 56 e 
Acraea necoda Le Site des Acraea de Dominique Bernaud
Acraea aglaonice Image collection Dominique Bernaud

Butterflies described in 1861
necoda
Endemic fauna of Ethiopia
Butterflies of Africa
Taxa named by William Chapman Hewitson